New Jersey is one of the wealthiest states in the United States of America, with a per capita income of $35,928 (2012) and a personal per capita income of $50,781 (2010). Its median household income is $71,637 (2012) and its median family income is $87,389 (2012), both the second highest in the country. The median value of an owner-occupied housing unit is $337,900 (2012), ranked fifth in the country. New Jersey has the highest percentage of millionaire residents in the country with 7.12% of New Jersey households having $1 million or more liquid or investible assets, not including equity in homes.

New Jersey’s proximity to the metropolitan giants of New York City and Philadelphia greatly influences its wealth. A vast majority of the state consists of suburbs of these two cities, an explanation for much of the state’s high incomes. Approximately 76% of New Jersey places have per capita incomes above the national average; however, according to the 2008-2012 American Community Survey, 9.9% (US average 14.9%) of the population lives below the poverty line. Three of the country's wealthiest counties are located in the north and central portion of the state, including Morris County (4th nationally), Somerset County (8th), and Hunterdon County(10th). There are also several seaside resorts along the New Jersey shoreline that are particularly wealthy, such as Mantoloking, Sea Girt, and Spring Lake along the coast close to New York and Sea Isle City, Avalon, and Stone Harbor in the south. Southern New Jersey, is less affluent overall, excluding several Philadelphia suburbs in Camden, Burlington and Gloucester Counties and the coast.  Camden, the poorest city in the state, has a poverty rate of 35.5%. Other poor areas are the cities across the Hudson River from New York City, including Newark, Paterson, and Passaic.

In 2012, 9.1% of New Jersey households have annual incomes of or over $200,000, and 17.5% have incomes of $100,000 or more. By contrast, 5.3% have incomes of less than $10,000, and 24.9% less than $34,999.

New Jersey counties ranked by per capita income 

Note: Data is from the 2010 United States Census Data and the 2006-2010 American Community Survey 5-Year Estimates.

New Jersey places ranked by per capita income 

This is a list of all incorporated areas and census-designated places in New Jersey ranked by per capita income based on the 2000 United States Census. There are many communities not on the list because they are neither incorporated nor a census-designated place. If a place cannot be located, try looking it up under the municipality in which it is located.

102 Park Ridge, New Jersey	$40,351	
103 Allenwood, New Jersey	$40,148	
104 Norwood, New Jersey	$40,039	
105 Scotch Plains, New Jersey	$39,913	
106 Morganville, New Jersey	$39,802	
107 Franklin Township, Hunterdon County, New Jersey	$39,668	
108 Bridgewater Township, New Jersey	$39,555	
109 Oradell, New Jersey	$39,520	
110 Beach Haven West, New Jersey	$39,273	
111 Township of Washington, Bergen County, New Jersey	$39,248	
112 Harrington Park, New Jersey	$39,017	
113 Plainsboro Township, New Jersey	$38,982	
114 Raritan Township, New Jersey	$38,919	
115 Medford Township, New Jersey	$38,641	
116 Marlboro Township, New Jersey	$38,635	
117 Whitehouse Station, New Jersey	$38,627	
118 Denville Township, New Jersey	$38,607	
119 Deal, New Jersey	$38,510	
120 Madison, New Jersey	$38,416	
120 Hopewell, New Jersey	$38,413	
121 West Caldwell, New Jersey	$38,345	
122 Delaware Township, New Jersey	$38,285	
123 Shrewsbury, New Jersey	$38,218	
124 Lawrenceville, New Jersey	$37,919	
125 Lincroft, New Jersey	$37,910	
126 Fort Lee, New Jersey	$37,899	
127 Hanover Township, New Jersey	$37,708	
128 Washington Township, Morris County, New Jersey	$37,489	
129 Clinton, New Jersey	$37,463	
130 Green Brook Township, New Jersey	$37,290	
131 Millstone Township, New Jersey	$37,285	
132 Clinton Township, New Jersey	$37,264	
133 East Amwell Township, New Jersey	$37,187	
134 Closter, New Jersey	$37,065	
135 Concordia, New Jersey	$36,962	
136 Sparta Township, New Jersey	$36,910	
137 Maplewood, New Jersey	$36,794	
138 Harvey Cedars, New Jersey	$36,757	
139 Springfield Township, Union County, New Jersey	$36,754	
140 Metuchen, New Jersey	$36,749	
141 Long Valley, New Jersey	$36,711	
142 Princeton Meadows, New Jersey	$36,654	
143 Cedar Grove, New Jersey	$36,558	
144 Plainsboro Center, New Jersey	$36,555	
145 Morris Plains, New Jersey	$36,553	
146 Lambertville, New Jersey	$36,267	
147 Audubon Park, New Jersey	$36,250	
148 Brielle, New Jersey	$35,785	
149 Robbinsville Township, New Jersey	$35,529	
150 Leonia, New Jersey	$35,352	
151 Wayne Township, New Jersey	$35,349	
152 Bethlehem Township, New Jersey	$35,298	
153 Englewood, New Jersey	$35,275	
154 Oakland, New Jersey	$35,252	
155 Monmouth Junction, New Jersey	$35,134	
156 East Freehold, New Jersey	$35,119	
157 Spring Lake Heights, New Jersey	$35,093	
158 Fanwood, New Jersey	$34,804	
159 Atlantic Highlands, New Jersey	$34,798	
160 Hillsdale, New Jersey	$34,651	
161 Caldwell, New Jersey	$34,630	
162 Alexandria Township, New Jersey	$34,622	
163 Barnegat Light, New Jersey	$34,599	
164 Kingston, New Jersey	$34,457	
165 West Orange, New Jersey	$34,412	
166 Greentree, New Jersey	$34,371	
167 Moorestown-Lenola, New Jersey	$34,311	
168 Middletown Township, New Jersey	$34,196	
169 Green Township, New Jersey	$34,127	
170 Wenonah, New Jersey	$34,116	
171 Lebanon, New Jersey	$34,066	
172 Loch Arbour, New Jersey	$34,037	
173 West Amwell Township, New Jersey	$33,877	
174 Voorhees Township, New Jersey	$33,635	
175 Margate City, New Jersey	$33,566	
176 Long Beach Township, New Jersey	$33,404	
177 Oceanport, New Jersey	$33,356	
178 East Brunswick Township, New Jersey $33,286
180 Cranford, New Jersey	$33,283	
181 Little Falls Township, New Jersey	$33,242	
182 West Freehold, New Jersey	$33,218	
183 Ocean City, New Jersey	$33,217	
184 River Edge, New Jersey	$33,188	
185 Rockaway Township, New Jersey	$33,184	
186 Lawrence Township, Mercer County, New Jersey	$33,120	
187 Hillsborough Township, New Jersey	$33,091	
188 Strathmore, New Jersey	$32,984	
189 Wall Township, New Jersey	$32,954	
190 Manasquan, New Jersey	$32,898	
191 Greenwich Township, Warren County, New Jersey	$32,886	
192 Cherry Hill Township, New Jersey	$32,658	
193 Dover Beaches North, New Jersey	$32,613	
194 White Meadow Lake, New Jersey	$32,596	
195 Brass Castle, New Jersey	$32,393	
196 Midland Park, New Jersey	$32,284	
197 Fair Lawn, New Jersey	$32,273	
198 Barclay-Kingston, New Jersey	$32,259	
199 Mount Laurel Township, New Jersey	$32,245	

201 Mount Arlington, New Jersey	$32,222	
202 Parsippany-Troy Hills Township, New Jersey	$32,220	
203 Teaneck, New Jersey	$32,212	
204 Linwood, New Jersey	$32,159	
205 Manalapan Township, New Jersey	$32,142	
206 East Hanover Township, New Jersey	$32,129	
207 South Brunswick Township, New Jersey	$32,104	
208 Fairfield Township, Essex County, New Jersey	$32,099	
209 Westwood, New Jersey	$32,083	
210 Succasunna-Kenvil, New Jersey	$31,923	
211 Pequannock Township, New Jersey	$31,892	
212 Monroe Township, Middlesex County, New Jersey	$31,772	
213 Secaucus, New Jersey	$31,684	
214 Tinton Falls, New Jersey	$31,520	
215 Emerson, New Jersey	$31,506	
216 Freehold Township, New Jersey	$31,505	
217 Fredon Township, New Jersey	$31,430	
218 Medford Lakes, New Jersey	$31,382	
219 Ringwood, New Jersey	$31,341	
220 Franklin Township, Somerset County, New Jersey	$31,209	
221 Shark River Hills, New Jersey	$31,196	
222 Riverdale, New Jersey	$31,187	
223 Rossmoor, New Jersey	$31,178	
224 Society Hill, New Jersey	$31,143	
225 Yorketown, New Jersey	$31,132	
226 Califon, New Jersey	$31,064	
227 Shamong Township, New Jersey	$30,934	
228 Lebanon Township, New Jersey	$30,793	
229 Waldwick, New Jersey	$30,733	
230 Byram Township, New Jersey	$30,710	
231 Millstone, New Jersey	$30,694	
232 Ocean Township, Monmouth County, New Jersey	$30,581	
233 Independence Township, New Jersey	$30,555	
234 Brownville, New Jersey	$30,520	
235 Rutherford, New Jersey	$30,495	
236 Lafayette Township, New Jersey	$30,491	
237 Lincoln Park, New Jersey	$30,389	
238 North Haledon, New Jersey	$30,322	
239 Matawan, New Jersey	$30,320	
240 Ramblewood, New Jersey	$30,308	
241 Beach Haven, New Jersey	$30,267	
242 Riverton, New Jersey	$30,223	
243 Kingwood Township, New Jersey	$30,219	
244 Annandale, New Jersey	$30,176	
245 Roxbury Township, New Jersey	$30,174	
246 Edison, New Jersey	$30,148	
247 Seaside Park, New Jersey	$30,090	
248 Morristown, New Jersey	$30,086	
249 Hardwick Township, New Jersey	$30,038	
250 Milltown, New Jersey	$29,996	
251 Boonton, New Jersey	$29,919	
252 Fairview, Monmouth County, New Jersey	$29,914	
253 Cape May, New Jersey	$29,902	
254 Clark, New Jersey	$29,883	
255 Wood-Ridge, New Jersey	$29,865	
256 Woodland Park, New Jersey (formerly West Paterson)	$29,758	
257 North Beach Haven, New Jersey	$29,752	
258 Clearbrook Park, New Jersey	$29,688	
259 Hasbrouck Heights, New Jersey	$29,626	
260 Vista Center, New Jersey	$29,620	
261 Union Township, Hunterdon County, New Jersey	$29,535	
262 Woolwich Township, New Jersey	$29,503	
263 Evesham Township, New Jersey $29,494	
264 Belmar, New Jersey	$29,456	
265 Allentown, New Jersey	$29,455	
266 Upper Freehold Township, New Jersey	$29,387	
267 Highlands, New Jersey	$29,369	
268 Beattystown, New Jersey	$29,345	
269 Springfield Township, Burlington County, New Jersey	$29,322	
270 High Bridge, New Jersey	$29,276	
271 Weehawken Township, New Jersey	$29,269	
272 Andover Township, New Jersey	$29,180	
273 Washington Township, Warren County, New Jersey	$29,141	
274 New Milford, New Jersey	$29,064	
275 Deptford Township, New Jersey	$28,986	
276 Aberdeen Township, New Jersey	$28,984	
277 Olivet, New Jersey	$28,981	
278 Ashland, New Jersey	$28,936	
279 Dayton, New Jersey	$28,924	
280 Cherry Hill Mall, New Jersey	$28,892	
281 Leisure Village East, New Jersey	$28,879	
282 Frelinghuysen Township, New Jersey	$28,792	
283 Highland Park, New Jersey	$28,767	
284 Sea Isle City, New Jersey	$28,754	
285 Turnersville, New Jersey	$28,734	
286 Carlstadt, New Jersey	$28,713	
287 East Windsor Township, New Jersey	$28,695	
288 Mount Olive Township, New Jersey	$28,691	
289 Glen Gardner, New Jersey	$28,647	
290 Harrison Township, New Jersey	$28,645	
291 West Milford Township, New Jersey	$28,612	
292 Hightstown, New Jersey	$28,605	
293 Lavallette, New Jersey	$28,588	
294 Holland Township, New Jersey	$28,581	
295 Cliffside Park, New Jersey	$28,516	
296 Hardyston Township, New Jersey	$28,457	
297 North Brunswick Township, New Jersey	$28,431	
298 Northvale, New Jersey	$28,206	
299 Haddon Heights, New Jersey	$28,198	
300 Maywood, New Jersey	$28,117	

301 Hainesport Township, New Jersey	$28,091	
302 East Rutherford, New Jersey	$28,072	
303 Nutley, New Jersey	$28,039	
304 Jefferson Township, New Jersey	$27,950	
305 Guttenberg, New Jersey	$27,931	
306 Hope Township, New Jersey	$27,902	
307 Tabernacle Township, New Jersey	$27,874	
308 Ship Bottom, New Jersey	$27,870	
309 Point Pleasant Beach, New Jersey	$27,853	
310 Middlesex, New Jersey	$27,834	
311 Cinnaminson Township, New Jersey	$27,790	
312 Blairstown Township, New Jersey	$27,775	
313 Frenchtown, New Jersey	$27,765	
314 Bloomingdale, New Jersey	$27,736	
315 Colonia, New Jersey	$27,732	
316 Great Meadows-Vienna, New Jersey	$27,688	
317 Navesink, New Jersey	$27,673	
318 West Long Branch, New Jersey	$27,651	
319 Lake Telemark, New Jersey	$27,620	
320 Leisuretowne, New Jersey	$27,581	
321 Saddle Brook, New Jersey	$27,561	
322 Stanhope, New Jersey	$27,535	
323 Upper Township, New Jersey	$27,498	
324 Pilesgrove Township, New Jersey	$27,400	
325 Princeton, New Jersey	$27,292	
326 Oakhurst, New Jersey	$27,235	
327 Franklin Township, Warren County, New Jersey	$27,224	
328 South Hackensack, New Jersey	$27,128	
329 Mine Hill Township, New Jersey	$27,119	
330 Butler, New Jersey	$27,113	
331 Lake Como, New Jersey	$27,111	
332 Mercerville-Hamilton Square, New Jersey	$27,080	
333 Kendall Park, New Jersey	$26,986	
334 Southampton Township, New Jersey	$26,977	
335 Island Heights, New Jersey	$26,975	
336 Eatontown, New Jersey	$26,965	
337 Garwood, New Jersey	$26,944	
338 Bordentown Township, New Jersey	$26,934	
339 Hackensack, New Jersey	$26,856	
340 Logan Township, New Jersey	$26,853	
341 Echelon, New Jersey	$26,850	
342 Old Bridge Township, New Jersey	$26,814	
343 Pompton Lakes, New Jersey	$26,802	
344 Iselin, New Jersey	$26,793	
345 Wanamassa, New Jersey	$26,759	
346 Dover Beaches South, New Jersey	$26,702	
347 Hopatcong, New Jersey	$26,698	
348 Helmetta, New Jersey	$26,668	
349 Surf City, New Jersey	$26,632	
350 Westampton Township, New Jersey	$26,594	
351 Totowa, New Jersey	$26,561	
352 Mansfield Township, Burlington County, New Jersey	$26,559	
353 Hawthorne, New Jersey	$26,551	
354 Dunellen, New Jersey	$26,529	
355 Twin Rivers, New Jersey	$26,501	
356 Rockaway, New Jersey	$26,500	
357 Dumont, New Jersey	$26,489	
358 Pine Beach, New Jersey	$26,487	
359 Raritan, New Jersey	$26,420	
360 Old Bridge, New Jersey	$26,395	
361 Bloomsbury, New Jersey	$26,392	
362 Piscataway Township, New Jersey	$26,321	
363 Mansfield Township, Warren County, New Jersey	$26,277	
364 Red Bank, New Jersey	$26,265	
365 Ocean Grove, New Jersey	$26,232	
366 Howell Township, New Jersey	$26,143	
367 Woodland Township, New Jersey	$26,126	
368 Bloomfield, New Jersey	$26,049	
369 Gibbsboro, New Jersey	$26,035	
370 South Harrison Township, New Jersey	$25,968	
371 Lyndhurst, New Jersey	$25,940	
372 Fords, New Jersey	$25,917	
373 Andover, New Jersey	$25,914	
374 Bordentown, New Jersey	$25,882	
375 Lumberton Township, New Jersey	$25,789	
376 Harmony Township, New Jersey	$25,776	
377 Point Pleasant, New Jersey	$25,715	
378 Stockton, New Jersey	$25,712	
379 Washington Township, Gloucester County, New Jersey	$25,705	
380 Forked River, New Jersey	$25,696	
381 West Cape May, New Jersey	$25,663	
382 Haddon Township, New Jersey	$25,610	
383 Merchantville, New Jersey	$25,589	
384 Ridgefield, New Jersey	$25,558	
385 Bogota, New Jersey	$25,505	
386 White Horse, New Jersey	$25,480	
387 Hamilton Township, Mercer County, New Jersey	$25,441	
388 Bradley Beach, New Jersey	$25,438	
389 Elsinboro Township, New Jersey	$25,415	
390 Belford, New Jersey	$25,412	
391 Wanaque, New Jersey	$25,403	
392 Stafford Township, New Jersey	$25,397	
393 Yardville-Groveville, New Jersey	$25,391	
394 Erlton-Ellisburg, New Jersey	$25,357	
395 Hampton Township, New Jersey	$25,353	
396 East Greenwich Township, New Jersey	$25,345	
397 Delran Township, New Jersey	$25,312	
398 South Plainfield, New Jersey	$25,270	
399 Hazlet Township, New Jersey	$25,262	
400 Vernon Township, New Jersey	$25,250	

401 Spotswood, New Jersey	$25,247	
402 Wharton, New Jersey	$25,168	
403 Marlton, New Jersey	$25,145	
404 Woodbridge Township, New Jersey	$25,087	
405 Woodbridge, New Jersey	$25,087	
406 Northfield, New Jersey	$25,059	
407 Rochelle Park, New Jersey	$25,054	
408 Frankford Township, New Jersey	$25,051	
409 Milford, New Jersey	$25,039	
410 Leisure Knoll, New Jersey	$25,012	
411 Toms River, New Jersey	$25,010	
412 Audubon, New Jersey	$24,942	
413 Stillwater Township, New Jersey	$24,933	
414 Roosevelt, New Jersey	$24,892	
415 Toms River, New Jersey	$24,831	
416 Greenwich Township, Gloucester County, New Jersey	$24,791	
417 White Township, New Jersey	$24,783	
418 Union Township, Union County, New Jersey	$24,768	
419 Burlington Township, New Jersey	$24,754	
420 Beckett, New Jersey	$24,754	
421 Pohatcong Township, New Jersey	$24,754	
422 Liberty Township, New Jersey	$24,743	
423 Hackettstown, New Jersey	$24,742	
424 Sayreville, New Jersey	$24,736	
425 Pemberton Heights, New Jersey	$24,716	
426 Bergenfield, New Jersey	$24,706	
427 Sewaren, New Jersey	$24,681	
428 Berlin, New Jersey $24,675	
429 Moonachie, New Jersey	$24,654	
430 Hamburg, New Jersey	$24,651	
431 Knowlton Township, New Jersey	$24,631	
432 Budd Lake, New Jersey	$24,581	
433 Eastampton Township, New Jersey	$24,534	
434 Brick Township, New Jersey	$24,462	
435 North Arlington, New Jersey	$24,441	
436 Barrington, New Jersey	$24,434	
437 Wallington, New Jersey	$24,431	
438 Port Republic, New Jersey	$24,369	
439 Collingswood, New Jersey	$24,358	
440 Kenilworth, New Jersey	$24,343	
441 Lopatcong Township, New Jersey	$24,333	
442 Ogdensburg, New Jersey	$24,305	
443 Ridgefield Park, New Jersey	$24,290	
444 Ewing Township, New Jersey	$24,268	
445 Mannington Township, New Jersey	$24,262	
446 West Deptford Township, New Jersey	$24,219	
447 Little Ferry, New Jersey	$24,210	
448 Woodstown, New Jersey	$24,182	
449 Oaklyn, New Jersey	$24,157	
450 Mantua Township, New Jersey	$24,147	
451 Roselle Park, New Jersey	$24,101	
452 Woodbury Heights, New Jersey	$24,001	
453 Pine Valley, New Jersey	$23,981	
454 Jackson Township, New Jersey	$23,981	
455 Port Reading, New Jersey	$23,978	
456 Brigantine, New Jersey	$23,950	
457 Gibbstown, New Jersey	$23,931	
458 Fieldsboro, New Jersey	$23,908	
459 Sandyston Township, New Jersey	$23,854	
460 Crestwood Village, New Jersey	$23,841	
461 Maple Shade Township, New Jersey	$23,812	
462 Flemington, New Jersey	$23,769	
463 Wildwood Crest, New Jersey	$23,741	
464 South River, New Jersey	$23,684	
465 Clifton, New Jersey	$23,638	
466 Laurence Harbor, New Jersey	$23,619	
467 Absecon, New Jersey	$23,615	
468 South Amboy, New Jersey	$23,598	
469 Shrewsbury Township, New Jersey	$23,574	
470 Oxford, New Jersey	$23,563	
471 Florence Township, New Jersey	$23,529	
472 Oxford Township, New Jersey	$23,515	
473 Mays Landing, New Jersey	$23,477	
474 Netcong, New Jersey	$23,472	
475 Palmyra, New Jersey	$23,454	
476 Englishtown, New Jersey	$23,438	
477 Leonardo, New Jersey	$23,422	
478 Jamesburg, New Jersey	$23,325	
479 Somerville, New Jersey	$23,310	
480 Manville, New Jersey	$23,293	
481 Keyport, New Jersey	$23,288	
482 Laurel Springs, New Jersey	$23,254	
483 Leisure Village, New Jersey	$23,246	
484 Belvidere, New Jersey	$23,231	
485 Washington, New Jersey	$23,166	
486 Lacey Township, New Jersey	$23,136	
487 Ramtown, New Jersey	$23,042	
488 Presidential Lakes Estates, New Jersey	$22,995	
489 Alloway Township, New Jersey	$22,935	
490 Edgewater Park Township, New Jersey	$22,920	
491 Manahawkin, New Jersey	$22,875	
492 Cliffwood Beach, New Jersey	$22,874	
493 Ocean Township, Ocean County, New Jersey	$22,830	
494 North Plainfield, New Jersey	$22,791	
495 Hopewell Township, Cumberland County, New Jersey $22,783	
496 Holiday City-Berkeley, New Jersey	$22,755	
497 Branchville, New Jersey	$22,748	
498 Pennsville Township, New Jersey	$22,717	
499 Ventnor City, New Jersey	$22,631	
500 Palisades Park, New Jersey	$22,607	

501 Gloucester Township, New Jersey	$22,604	
502 Elmwood Park, New Jersey	$22,588	
503 Neptune Township, New Jersey	$22,569	
504 Mullica Hill, New Jersey	$22,503	
505 Oldmans Township, New Jersey	$22,495	
506 Wantage Township, New Jersey	$22,488	
507 Rahway, New Jersey	$22,481	
508 Hampton, New Jersey	$22,440	
509 Plumsted Township, New Jersey	$22,433	
510 Manchester Township, New Jersey	$22,409	
511 Silver Ridge, New Jersey	$22,403	
512 Bound Brook, New Jersey	$22,395	
513 Egg Harbor Township, New Jersey	$22,328	
514 West Belmar, New Jersey	$22,276	
515 Greenwich Township, Cumberland County, New Jersey	$22,233	
516 Somers Point, New Jersey	$22,229	
517 Berkeley Township, New Jersey	$22,198	
518 Neptune City, New Jersey	$22,191	
519 Berlin Township, New Jersey	$22,178	
520 Leisure Village West-Pine Lake Park, New Jersey	$22,149	
521 Pitman, New Jersey	$22,133	
522 Belleville, New Jersey	$22,093	
523 Florence-Roebling, New Jersey	$22,074	
524 Waretown, New Jersey	$22,061	
525 Lower Alloways Creek Township, New Jersey	$21,962	
526 Blackwood, New Jersey	$21,815	
527 Willingboro Township, New Jersey	$21,799	
528 Stratford, New Jersey	$21,748	
529 Upper Pittsgrove Township, New Jersey	$21,732	
530 Hillside, New Jersey	$21,724	
531 Waterford Township, New Jersey	$21,676	
532 Farmingdale, New Jersey	$21,667	
533 Lodi, New Jersey	$21,667	
534 Pittsgrove Township, New Jersey	$21,624	
535 Madison Park, New Jersey	$21,622	
536 Woodbury, New Jersey	$21,592	
537 Winfield Township, New Jersey	$21,565	
538 Cape May Court House, New Jersey	$21,541	
539 Bayonne, New Jersey	$21,533	
540 Dennis Township, New Jersey	$21,455	
541 Barnegat, New Jersey	$21,431	
542 Port Monmouth, New Jersey	$21,369	
543 Elmer, New Jersey	$21,356	
544 Corbin City, New Jersey	$21,321	
545 Linden, New Jersey	$21,314	
546 Hamilton Township, Atlantic County, New Jersey	$21,309	
547 Roselle, New Jersey	$21,269	
548 Somerdale, New Jersey	$21,259	
549 Winslow Township, New Jersey	$21,254	
550 Ocean Acres, New Jersey	$21,249	
551 Beachwood, New Jersey	$21,247	
552 Mount Ephraim, New Jersey	$21,150	
553 South Bound Brook, New Jersey	$21,131	
554 Delanco Township, New Jersey	$21,096	
555 Glendora, New Jersey	$21,089	
556 Newfield, New Jersey	$21,063	
557 Galloway Township, New Jersey	$21,048	
558 Union Beach, New Jersey	$20,973	
559 Stow Creek Township, New Jersey	$20,925	
560 Kearny, New Jersey	$20,886	
561 Swedesboro, New Jersey	$20,857	
562 Erma, New Jersey	$20,765	
563 Montague Township, New Jersey	$20,676	
564 Little Egg Harbor Township, New Jersey	$20,619	
565 Folsom, New Jersey	$20,617	
566 Eagleswood Township, New Jersey	$20,617	
567 Victory Gardens, New Jersey	$20,616	
568 Victory Lakes, New Jersey	$20,615	
569 Newton, New Jersey	$20,577	
570 Country Lake Estates, New Jersey	$20,554	
571 Long Branch, New Jersey	$20,532	
572 Monroe Township (Gloucester County, New Jersey)	$20,488	
573 North Middletown, New Jersey	$20,462	
574 Bass River Township, New Jersey	$20,382	
575 Pine Ridge at Crestwood, New Jersey	$20,320	
576 Franklin Township, Gloucester County, New Jersey	$20,277	
577 Cedar Glen Lakes, New Jersey	$20,246	
578 Burlington, New Jersey	$20,208	
579 Tuckerton, New Jersey	$20,118	
580 Alpha, New Jersey	$20,104	
581 North Bergen Township, New Jersey	$20,058	
582 Clayton, New Jersey	$20,006	
583 Fairton, New Jersey	$20,005	
584 Carneys Point Township, New Jersey	$19,978	
585 Freehold Borough, New Jersey	$19,910	
586 Hammonton, New Jersey	$19,889	
587 Bellmawr, New Jersey	$19,863	
588 Middle Township, New Jersey	$19,805	
589 Avenel, New Jersey	$19,794	
590 Lower Township, New Jersey	$19,786	
591 Mullica Township, New Jersey	$19,764	
592 Mount Holly Township, New Jersey	$19,672	
593 North Wildwood, New Jersey	$19,656	
594 Cedar Glen West, New Jersey	$19,548	
595 Garfield, New Jersey	$19,530	
596 Estell Manor, New Jersey	$19,469	
597 Jersey City, New Jersey	$19,410	
598 Franklin, New Jersey	$19,386	
599 Barnegat Township, New Jersey	$19,307	
600 Hi-Nella, New Jersey	$19,285	

601 Ocean Gate, New Jersey	$19,239	
602 Pemberton Township, New Jersey	$19,238	
603 Oak Valley, New Jersey	$19,148	
604 Runnemede, New Jersey	$19,143	
605 Williamstown, New Jersey	$19,112	
606 Haledon, New Jersey	$19,099	
607 Holiday Heights, New Jersey	$19,062	
608 Plainfield, New Jersey	$19,052	
609 Magnolia, New Jersey	$19,032	
610 Pennsauken, New Jersey	$19,004	
611 Weymouth Township, New Jersey	$18,987	
612 Carteret, New Jersey	$18,967	
613 Quinton Township, New Jersey	$18,921	
614 Pemberton, New Jersey	$18,909	
615 Upper Deerfield Township, New Jersey	$18,884	
616 Sussex, New Jersey	$18,866	
617 Fairview, Bergen County, New Jersey	$18,835	
618 Lawnside, New Jersey	$18,831	
619 Vineland, New Jersey	$18,797	
620 Rio Grande, New Jersey	$18,792	
621 New Egypt, New Jersey	$18,771	
622 Riverside Township, New Jersey	$18,758	
623 Westville, New Jersey	$18,747	
624 Mystic Island, New Jersey	$18,737	
625 Holiday City South, New Jersey	$18,726	
626 Seaside Heights, New Jersey	$18,665	
627 Lindenwold, New Jersey	$18,659	
628 Millville, New Jersey	$18,632	
629 Elk Township, New Jersey	$18,621	
630 Pine Hill, New Jersey	$18,613	
631 Clementon, New Jersey	$18,510	
632 Harrison, New Jersey	$18,490	
633 Deerfield Township, New Jersey	$18,468	
634 Phillipsburg, New Jersey	$18,452	
635 North Cape May, New Jersey	$18,420	
636 Lakehurst, New Jersey	$18,390	
637 Buena Vista Township, New Jersey	$18,382	
638 Brooklawn, New Jersey	$18,295	
639 Pomona, New Jersey	$18,182	
640 Glassboro, New Jersey	$18,113	
641 Dover, New Jersey	$18,056	
642 National Park, New Jersey	$18,048	
643 Collings Lakes, New Jersey	$17,903	
644 West Wildwood, New Jersey	$17,839	
645 Beverly, New Jersey	$17,760	
646 Browns Mills, New Jersey	$17,678	
647 Pleasantville, New Jersey	$17,668	
648 Lawrence Township, Cumberland County, New Jersey	$17,654	
649 Walpack Township, New Jersey	$17,624	
650 North Hanover Township, New Jersey	$17,580	
651 Fairfield Township, Cumberland County, New Jersey	$17,547	
652 Keansburg, New Jersey	$17,417	
653 Downe Township, New Jersey	$17,366	
654 Chesterfield Township, New Jersey	$17,193	
655 Maurice River Township, New Jersey	$17,141	
656 Gloucester, New Jersey	$16,912	
657 Shiloh, Cumberland County, New Jersey	$16,880	
658 Irvington, New Jersey	$16,874	
659 Orange, New Jersey	$16,861	
660 Whitesboro-Burleigh, New Jersey	$16,812	
661 West New York, New Jersey	$16,719	
662 Buena, New Jersey	$16,717	
663 Lakewood Township, New Jersey	$16,700	
664 Villas, New Jersey	$16,696	
665 East Orange, New Jersey	$16,488	
666 East Newark, New Jersey	$16,415	
667 Prospect Park, New Jersey	$16,410	
668 Paulsboro, New Jersey	$16,368	
669 South Toms River, New Jersey	$16,292	
670 Port Norris, New Jersey	$16,195	
671 Cedarville, New Jersey	$15,446	
672 Atlantic City, New Jersey	$15,402	
673 Chesilhurst, New Jersey	$15,252	
674 Egg Harbor City, New Jersey	$15,151	
675 Elizabeth, New Jersey	$15,114	
676 Perth Amboy, New Jersey	$14,989	
677 Rosenhayn, New Jersey	$14,801	
678 Woodlynne, New Jersey	$14,757	
679 Commercial Township, New Jersey	$14,663	
680 Trenton, New Jersey	$14,621	
681 Tavistock, New Jersey	$14,600	
682 Wrightstown, New Jersey	$14,489	
683 New Brunswick, New Jersey	$14,308	
684 Union City, New Jersey	$13,997	
685 Washington Township, Burlington County, New Jersey	$13,977	
686 Wildwood, New Jersey	$13,682	
687 Elwood-Magnolia, New Jersey	$13,678	
688 Salem, New Jersey	$13,599	
689 Asbury Park, New Jersey	$13,516	
690 Woodbine, New Jersey	$13,335	
691 Penns Grove, New Jersey	$13,330	
692 Paterson, New Jersey	$13,257	
693 Newark, New Jersey	$13,009	
694 Laurel Lake, New Jersey	$12,965	
695 Passaic, New Jersey	$12,874	
696 Seabrook Farms, New Jersey	$12,499	
697 McGuire Air Force Base, New Jersey	$12,364	
698 New Hanover Township, New Jersey	$12,140	
699 Lakewood CDP, New Jersey	$11,802	
700 Bridgeton, New Jersey	$10,917	
701 Fort Dix, New Jersey	$10,543	
702 Camden, New Jersey	$9,815

References

United States locations by per capita income
Per capita income
Income